The Union of Warriors for the Advancement of the Bulgarianness (Sayuz na ratnitsite za napredaka na balgarshtinata), commonly known as just the Ratniks (Ратници, Ratnitsi) was a far-right Bulgarian nationalist organization founded in 1936. Its ideas were close to those of Germany's Nazis, including antisemitism and paramilitarism, but also loyalty to the Bulgarian Orthodox Church. The Ratniks wore red uniforms in outright competition with the communists for the hearts and minds of the Bulgarian youth, and also badges bearing the Bogar: a Bulgarian sun cross, which became the symbol of the organization.

Despite decreeing their loyalty to the Monarchy and King Boris III of Bulgaria he officially dissolved the organisation in April 1939. The ban however was not enforced and they remained in existence. It was soon after the ban that they carried out one of their more notorious acts, the so-called "Bulgarian Kristallnacht" when, on September 20, 1939, the Ratniks marched in Sofia throwing stones at the Jewish shops. Police did not intervene and some shop windows were smashed although ultimately it proved to have much less impact than the German version and was widely condemned by most politicians. Alexander Belev, a leading member of the group, later claimed that the attack had been his idea and that he had personally led the mob.

With the coming of the Red Army and the Bolsheviks into Bulgaria on September 9, 1944 which led to a coup d'etat on the same day, the Ratniks disappeared from the Bulgarian scene. Many of the leaders became members of the Bulgarian national government abroad, some of the young Ratniks become volunteers in the Wehrmacht, while others stayed in Bulgaria to fight against the Communists.

References

See also
 Fascism in Bulgaria

Bulgarian war crimes
 
Organizations established in 1936
Far-right politics
Nationalist organizations
Political organizations based in Bulgaria
Anti-communist organizations
The Holocaust in Bulgaria
Bulgarian nationalism
Banned far-right parties
Fascist organizations